Valerie Ellen Stone (born 1958) is an American physician who is a professor of medicine at the Harvard Medical School. She serves as Vice Chair for Diversity, Equity, and Inclusion, Department of Medicine, Brigham and Women's Hospital. She specializes in the management of HIV/AIDS, health disparities and improving the quality of medical education.

Early life and education 
Stone is from Montclair, New Jersey. Stone has said that her early life inspired her career in medicine. As a child she lost her grandmother to metastatic cancer, and as an undergraduate student she lost a cousin to pneumonia caused by HIV/AIDS. Stone was already a successful science student at high school, and decided that she would eventually pursue a degree in medicine. As an undergraduate Stone studied chemical engineering, but whilst she enjoyed the science; she missed the interaction with members of society. Motivated by her grandmother, Stone became focused on women's health. She completed her medical education at the Yale University School of Medicine. She worked as a DJ throughout her studies and lived in the Harkness dorm. Whilst she was studying medicine, she saw members of her family, classmates and friends get infected with HIV. She has called AIDS the "defining disease of [her] generation". After graduating in 1984, Stone initially began residency in obstetrics and gynecology, but after internship, switched to internal medicine and completed medicine residency at Case Western Reserve University. As a medical resident, Stone joined the American College of Physicians, and she was board certified in 1988. She earned a Master of Public Health at the Harvard T.H. Chan School of Public Health. She later completed a fellowship in infectious diseases at the Boston City Hospital. Her first job was at Boston City Hospital, where she directed ambulatory care services.

Research and career 
After completing her training, Stone was appointed to the faculty at Harvard University. At the beginning of Stone's career medicine there were limited treatment pathways for patients with HIV/AIDS. She treated her first HIV/AIDS patient in 1983. In 1996, things dramatically changed, when highly active antiretroviral therapy (HAART) made it possible to manage AIDS like other chronic illnesses. Her research focused on why HIV/AIDS was so prevalent amongst Black communities, and how to optimize the care of patients from underserved communities. Whilst working at Harvard, Stone was an active primary care physician and a senior scientist at the Stoeckle Center for Primary Care Innovation at the Massachusetts General Hospital. She was appointed a full Professor of Medicine at Harvard in 2011, and was the first African-American to hold such a position.

In 2014, Stone was made Chair of the Department of Medicine at Mount Auburn Hospital, and was named the Charles S. Davidson Professor of Medicine at Harvard Medical School. She moved to the Brigham and Women's Hospital in 2019, where she was made the Vice Chair for Diversity, Equity, and Inclusion, while continuing her role at Harvard Medical School. Here she also serves on the faculty of the women's leadership program.

Throughout the COVID-19 pandemic, Stone used social media to discuss the disproportionate impact of SARS-CoV-2 on communities of colour. In the aftermath of the murder of George Floyd, Stone wrote to the faculty of Harvard Medical School to describe the anguish that she felt.

Academic service 
Stone was appointed a Fellow of the American College of Physicians in 1996. From 2001 to 2014 Stone directed the primary care residency program at Massachusetts General Hospital, and used the opportunity to transform the curriculum. As part of this effort Stone created training programs in cross-cultural care, health policy and women's health. She was elected to the American College of Physicians Board of Regents in 2008, and held this position for over 6 years. From 2012 to 2014 she served as Chair of the Education and Publications committee. She serves on the advisory board of the Fenway Institute National LGBT Health Education Alliance.

Awards and honors 
Her awards and honors include:
 1996 Fellow of the American College of Physicians
 2012 Society of General Internal Medicine Elnora Rhodes Award 
 2017 Action for Boston Community Development Hero Award
 2018 Massachusetts Chapter Laureate Award
 2020 American College of Physicians W. Lester Henry Award for Diversity and Access to Care
 Justice in Health Award from Justice Resource Institute Health

Selected publications 
Her publications include:

Washington, Donna L.; Bowles, Jacqueline; Saha, Somnath; Horowitz, Carol R.; Moody-Ayers, Sandra; Brown, Arleen F.; Stone, Valerie E.; Cooper, Lisa A.; Writing group for the Society of General Internal Medicine, Disparities in Health Task Force (2008-01-15). "Transforming Clinical Practice to Eliminate Racial-Ethnic Disparities in Healthcare." Journal of General Internal Medicine. 23 (5): 685–691. doi:10.1007/s11606-007-0481-0 ISSN 0884-8734

Personal life 
Stone is married to Kathryn Hall, a molecular geneticist at the Harvard Medical School. They have one daughter who works in healthcare management.

References 

1958 births
Living people
African-American physicians
Yale University alumni
Harvard Medical School faculty
American women physicians
Harvard School of Public Health alumni
American LGBT scientists
LGBT physicians
LGBT academics
American women academics
21st-century African-American people
20th-century African-American people
20th-century African-American women
21st-century African-American women